Memorial Medical Center is a hospital in the greater Stanislaus County, California, United States. It is licensed for 423 acute care beds and is affiliated with Sutter Health, a not-for-profit association of medical service providers. The main directions of the Memorial Medical Center are cardiac care, cancer treatment, orthopedics, obstetrics, and newborn intensive care.

The hospital was founded on May 1, 1970 and at the time had 99 beds. It has been affiliated with Sutter Health since 1996.

In 2021, Memorial Medical Center received the prestigious Lantern Award from Emergency Nursing Association.  Memorial was one of thirty-three facilities to receive the award nationally.

References

External links
This hospital in the CA Healthcare Atlas A project by OSHPD

Hospitals established in 1970
1970 establishments in California
Buildings and structures in Modesto, California

Sutter Health